This is a list of schools in North Lincolnshire, England.

State-funded schools

Primary schools

 Alkborough Primary School, Alkborough
 Althorpe and Keadby Primary School, Keadby
 Barton St Peter's CE Primary School, Barton-upon-Humber
 Belton All Saints CE Primary School, Belton
 Berkeley Junior School, Scunthorpe
 Bottesford Infant School, Bottesford
 Bottesford Junior School, Bottesford
 Bowmandale Primary School, Barton-upon-Humber
 Brigg Primary School, Brigg
 Broughton Primary School, Broughton
 Burton-upon-Stather Primary School, Burton upon Stather
 Bushfield Road Infant School, Scunthorpe
 Castledyke Primary School, Barton-upon-Humber
 Crosby Primary School, Scunthorpe
 Crowle Primary Academy, Crowle
 East Halton Primary School, East Halton
 Eastoft CE Primary School, Eastoft
 Enderby Road Infant School, Scunthorpe
 Epworth Primary Academy, Epworth
 Frodingham Infant School, Scunthorpe
 Goxhill Primary School, Barrow upon Humber
 The Grange Primary School, Scunthorpe
 Gunness and Burringham CE Primary School, Gunness
 Haxey CE Primary School, Haxey
 Hibaldstow Academy, Hibaldstow
 Holme Valley Primary School, Bottesford
 John Harrison CE Primary School, Barrow upon Humber
 Killingholme Primary School, South Killingholme
 Kirmington CE Primary School, Kirmington
 Kirton Lindsey Primary School, Kirton in Lindsey
 Leys Farm Junior School, Bottesford
 Lincoln Gardens Primary School, Ashby
 Luddington and Garthorpe Primary School, Luddington
 Messingham Primary School, Messingham
 New Holland CE and Methodist Primary School, New Holland
 Oakfield Primary School, Scunthorpe
 Oasis Academy Henderson Avenue, Scunthorpe
 Oasis Academy Parkwood, Scunthorpe
 Outwood Junior Academy Brumby, Scunthorpe
 Priory Lane Community School, Scunthorpe
 St Augustine Webster RC Academy, Scunthorpe
 St Barnabas CE Primary School, Barnetby le Wold
 St Bernadette's RC Primary Academy, Ashby
 St Martin's CE Primary School, Owston Ferry
 St Mary's RC Primary Academy, Brigg
 St Norbert's RC Primary Academy, Crowle
 St Peter and St Paul CE Primary School, Scuntorpe
 Scawby Academy, Scawby
 Scunthorpe CE Primary School, Scunthorpe
 South Ferriby Primary School, South Ferriby
 Ulceby St Nicholas CE Primary School, Ulceby
 West Butterwick CE Primary School, West Butterwick
 Westcliffe Primary School, Scunthorpe
 Westwoodside CE Academy, Westwoodside
 Willoughby Road Primary Academy, Scunthorpe
 Winteringham Primary School, Winteringham
 Winterton CE Infants' School, Winterton
 Winterton Junior School, Winterton
 Wootton St Andrew's CE Primary School, Wootton
 Worlaby Academy, Worlaby
 Wrawby St Mary's CE Primary School, Wrawby
 Wroot Travis CE Primary School, Wroot

Secondary schools

 The Axholme Academy, Crowle
 Baysgarth School, Barton-upon-Humber
 Engineering UTC Northern Lincolnshire, Scunthorpe
 Frederick Gough School, Bottesford
 Huntcliff School, Kirton in Lindsey
 Melior Community Academy, Scunthorpe
 Outwood Academy Brumby, Scunthorpe
 Outwood Academy Foxhills, Scunthorpe
 St Bede's Catholic Voluntary Academy, Scunthorpe
 St Lawrence Academy, Scunthorpe
 Sir John Nelthorpe School, Brigg
 South Axholme Academy, Epworth
 The Vale Academy, Brigg
 Winterton Community Academy, Winterton

Special and alternative schools
 Coritani Academy, Scunthorpe
 St Hugh's School, Scunthorpe
 St Luke's Primary School, Scuntorpe

Further education
 John Leggott College
 North Lindsey College

Independent schools

Senior and all-through schools
 OneSchool Global UK, Scunthorpe

Special and alternative schools
 Act Fast NL, Messingham
 Demeter House, Brigg
 Flourish With Us, Winterton
 Options Barton, Barton-upon-Humber
 Robert Holme Academy, Brigg
 South Park Enterprise College, Scunthorpe

Schools in the Borough of North Lincolnshire
North Lincolnshire